Lawrence 'Law Dogg' Samuels (born May 1, 1970) is an arena football coach and former wide receiver/linebacker. He played his college football at the Livingston University, and was an AFL wide receiver/linebacker from 1994 to 2010. He received both his Bachelor of Science degree in industrial technology and Master of Science degree in education from The University of West Alabama. He was head coach of the Tampa Bay Storm of the Arena Football League (AFL) from 2014 to 2016.

Early life
Born in Mobile, Alabama, Samuels attended Shaw High School in Mobile. Samuels was a basketball player in high school, but was lured to the football field after seeing most of his childhood friends join the Shaw team.

Professional career

Tampa Bay Storm
Samuels made his AFL debut in 1994 with the Tampa Bay Storm, racking up 247 receptions through the 2000 season for over 3,120 yards in his first tenure with the Storm.

New Jersey Gladiators
In 2001, Samuels left the Storm and played the season with the New Jersey Gladiators, catching 65 passes (a career high at the time) for 742 yards, just short of his 844-yard career high receiving season he recorded the year before with Tampa Bay.

Return to the Storm
After a single season in New Jersey, Samuels returned to Tampa, where he finished his playing career. From 2003-2007, Samuels notched 1,000+ yards receiving in 4 of 5 seasons, including back-to-back-to-back 1,100 yard+ seasons in 2005, 2006, and 2007. Was named MVP and Ironman of ArenaBowl XVII.

In 2007, after 5 losses to begin the season, Samuels was again named to the AFL's All-Ironman Team after leading the Storm to a #3 seed in the playoffs. 100+ catches, 1,000+ yards, and 100+ touchdowns also helped Samuels earn the honor.

On June 15, 2008, Samuels became the first receiver in AFL history to record 1,000 career receptions. 

On August 10, 2013, Samuels was inducted into the AFL Hall of Fame.

Coaching career
In 2002 and 2003, he was an assistant coach and wide receivers coach at Central High School in Brooksville, Florida.

He was the offensive coordinator and receivers coach for the Wharton High School Wildcats during the 2005 and 2006 seasons.

In 2011, Samuels was named the offensive coordinator of the Storm, working with one of his former coaches, Dave Ewart.

Ewart was fired in early August 2013, and on September 5, 2013, Samuels was promoted to head coach of the Storm. Samuels and the Storm mutually agreed to part ways in August 2016.

In 2022 Lawrence Samuels was hired as the tight end coach at Tuskegee University

https://goldentigersports.com/sports/football/roster/coaches/lawrence-samuels/379

Head coaching record

Personal
Samuels's brother, Chris Samuels, was a six-time Pro-Bowler in the National Football League (NFL). He and his wife, Kelli, have two daughters.

References

External links
 AFL stats

1970 births
Living people
American football linebackers
American football wide receivers
New Jersey Gladiators players
Tampa Bay Storm coaches
Tampa Bay Storm players
West Alabama Tigers football players
High school football coaches in Florida
Sportspeople from Mobile, Alabama
Players of American football from Alabama
African-American coaches of American football
African-American players of American football
21st-century African-American sportspeople
20th-century African-American sportspeople